Surajgarha(Nagar Parishad)  is one of seven blocks in Lakhisarai District of Bihar consisting of 117 villages. It lies on the banks of the Ganges River and is 17 km north-east of Lakhisarai.

Kajra Railway Station is the nearest major railhead.
This is a small town located 32 km from Munger and 16 km from Lakhisarai, on NH-33.

Weather
The weather here is of extreme type. Summer temperature stays at 40-45 C in day and Winters may see a drop till 5C. Heavy downpour is also experienced. The annual rainfall is 130 cm mainly in monsoons and winters due to Western Disturbances.

See also 

 Balgudar
 Bhaluee
 Maheshpur
 Nijai
 Pokhrama
 Sabikpur
 Siswan
 singarpur

References 

VAIDIK HOTEL

099555 16694

https://maps.app.goo.gl/ykN5KKdQhs1fScyz5
Villages in Lakhisarai district